The South East Combination Women's Football League, also known simply as the South East Combination, was a women's football league in England from 1998 to 2014. Until the creation of the FA Women's Super League in 2011, they sat at the third level of English women's football pyramid along with the three other Combination Leagues - South West, Midland and Northern. The South East Combination fed into the FA Women's Premier League Southern Division, and lied above the Eastern Region Women's Football League and the London and South East Women's Regional Football League in the pyramid. For the 2014–15 season the South East Combination was incorporated into the newly re-structured FA Women's Premier League as the FA WPL South East Division One.

Clubs for 2013–14 season

Previous winners

References
History of the South East Combination from secombination.org.uk. Archived July 8 2007.

External links
Official website of the South East Women's Combination League.

Sports leagues established in 1998
4